Excelsior Athlétique Club is a professional football club based in Port-au-Prince, Haiti.
The last time the club played in Division 1 was in 2002. After the 2008 season, the club was relegated to Division 3. In 1950, it captured the double after winning the league and the Coupe d'Haïti.

Honours
Ligue Haïtienne: 3
 1948, 1950, 1951

Coupe d'Haïti: 2
 1942, 1950

References

Football clubs in Haiti
Ouest (department)